Justice Prentice may refer to:

Dixon Prentice, associate justice of the Supreme Court of Indiana
Samuel O. Prentice, chief justice of the Connecticut Supreme Court
William Prentice, Justice and chief justice of the Supreme Court of Papua New Guinea